Edward Martini Sandoyan (born June 4, 1961 in Yerevan), is a doctor of Economic Sciences of Armenia and the Russian Federation, professor, and served as Minister of Finance & Economy of Armenia from 1998 to 1999.

Education 
1993–1994 - Academy of National Economy under the Government of the Russian Federation, Moscow, Studies for the doctoral degree in economics
1983–1987 - Yerevan State Polytechnic Institute, Yerevan, Postgraduate Studies, Department of Economics, Organization & Management in National Economy and Branches
1981–1983 - Yerevan State Polytechnic Institute, Yerevan, Department of Economics & Management in Machine-Building Industry. Diploma with Honors.
1978–1981 - Moscow Management Institute, Moscow, Department of Management in Machine-Building Industry

Professional experience 
May 2012 to present - Director, Head of the Academic Council of the Institute of Economics and Business at the Russian-Armenian (Slavonic) University, Yerevan
September 2009 to present - Head of Business School at the Russian-Armenian (Slavonic) State University, Yerevan
June 2007 to present - Professor of the faculty of "Economics and Finance" at the Russian-Armenian (Slavonic) University, Yerevan
June 2004 – May 2012 - Vice Rector for University Education Development at the Russian-Armenian (Slavonic) University, Yerevan
March 2002 to present - Member of the Academic Council at the Russian-Armenian (Slavonic) State University, Yerevan
March 2002 – September 2017 - Head of the Department of "Economics and Finance" at the Russian-Armenian (Slavonic) University, Yerevan
February 2001 – April 2003 - Armenian Stock Exchange SRO "Armex" (NASDAQ OMX Armenia), Yerevan, Chairman of the Supervisory Board
January 2000 – May 2004 - Yerevan State Institute of Economics, Yerevan, Associate Professor (docent), Faculty of Labour Economics
December 2000 – November 2002 - Union of Banks of Armenia, Yerevan, Deputy chairman
1999–2000 - Armagrobank jsc, Yerevan, CEO & chairman of the board
1998–1999 - Government of Armenia, Minister of Finance & Economy of Armenia
1994–1998 - Central Bank of Armenia, Head of the Main Department of Supervision, Regulation and Licensing
1993–1994 - Armaudit Service jsc, Yerevan, President - Albank Commercial Bank, Moscow, President
1991–1993 - Tax Inspectorate of Armenia, Deputy Chief of the Inspectorate & Deputy Minister
1988–1991 - Yerevan Polytechnic Institute (currently National Polytechnic University of Armenia), Yerevan, Associate Prof. (docent), -Faculty of Economics & Management of Machine-Building Industry
1986–1988 - Scientific Laboratory under the Ministry of Electro-Technical Industry of the USSR, Yerevan, Senior Researcher
1986–1988 - Yerevan State Institute of National Economy (currently Armenian State University of Economics), Yerevan, lecturer, then Associate Prof. (docent), Faculty of Labor Economics & Management
1983–1986, Yerevan State Polytechnic Institute, Yerevan, Researcher, Faculty of Economics & Management in Machine-Building Industry

Summary of Qualifications 
1983 - Yerevan State Polytechnic Institute, Economist, "Economics & Management in Machine-Building Industry" specialization
1987 - Supreme Committee for Certification of the USSR, Degree of Candidate of Economic Sc. (PhD)
1991 - State Committee for Public Education of the USSR, Associate Professor (docent), Faculty of Economics & Management in Machine-Building Industry
February 21, 2001 - Securities Commission of Armenia, Yerevan, Certificate No 0003 of Professional Qualification, (qualification for professional activity in the securities market)
June 1, 2007 - Russian-Armenian (Slavonic) State University, professor
March 26, 2008 - Higher Attestation Commission of the RA, Degree of Doctor of Economic Sciences
July 2, 2008 -  Higher Attestation Commission of the RA, Professor (Economics)
May 29, 2009 - Federal Service for Supervision in Education and Science, Russian Federation, Moscow, Degree of Doctor of Economic Sciences

Titles and awards 
November 27, 2008 - "Eurasian Economic Club of Scientists" Association, Astana, Kazakhstan, The academic title "Honorary Professor" of the "Eurasian Economic Club of Scientists" Association
October 28, 2011 - Urals State University of Economics, Yekaterinburg, RF, The academic title “Honorary Professor of the USUE”
March 29, 2013 - Russian-Armenian (Slavonic) State University, Yerevan, The award of the academician S.A. Sitaryan
June 26, 2013 - State Committee of Science at the Ministry of Education and Science of the RA, Yerevan, Winner of the "Best Scientist in Social Sciences – 2013" contest"
August 13, 2013 - The Ministry of Defence of the RA, Awarded with the medal of "Drastamat Kanayan"
December 1, 2014 - Decree of the President of the RA, Awarded with the medal of "Movses Khorenatsi"
February 12, 2015 - State Committee of Science at the Ministry of Education and Science of Armenia, Yerevan, Winner of the "Best Scientist in Social Sciences – 2014" contest"
September 24, 2016 - State Committee of Science at the Ministry of Education and Science Armenia, Yerevan, Winner of "The Best Scientist in Social Sciences - 2016" Contest
October 20, 2017 - Mesrop Mashtots University, Stepanakert, The academic title "Honorary Professor of the Mesrop Mashtots"
June 7,  2018 - State Committee of Science at the Ministry of Education and Science of the Republic of Armenia, Yerevan, Winner of "The Best Scientist in Social Sciences - 2018" Contest (Top 100)
March 6, 2020 - Committee of Science at the Ministry of Education, Science, Culture and Sport of the Republic of Armenia, Yerevan, Winner of "The Best Scientist in Social Sciences - 2019" Contest (Top 100)
August 2, 2022 - Academy of Pedagogical and Psychological Sciences of Armenia, Yerevan, Full Member (Academician), Member of the Presidium

Scientific and professorial, law development activities 
Edward Sandoyan is the author of 274 published academic papers, textbooks, and manuals of more than 320 printer's sheet, as well as over 60 newspaper articles. Participated in the development of the majority of Armenian laws and legislative documents covering banking and taxation; authored the banking regulation and supervision framework existing in Armenia (1994–2003).

He was the scientific adviser (mentor) to 5 postgraduate and 2 doctorate students. Prepared 33 candidates of Economic Science (PhDs) and 1 Doctor of Science under my academic supervision. Participated in the development of the majority of Armenian laws and legislative documents covering banking and taxation; authored the banking regulation and supervision framework existing in Armenia.

Past Activities 
 International Monetary Fund (IMF) - Governor - Armenia
 World Bank - Governor - Armenia
 European Bank for Reconstruction and Development (EBRD) - Head of the Country Delegation– Armenia
 “Armenia” Pan-Armenian Fund - Member of the Board of Trustees
 International Association of Exchanges of CIS Countries, Moscow - Member of the Council
 UNDP National Expert

Also: Chairman and member of several Armenian Government Committees, Chairman of the Central Bank of Armenia Licensing and Sanctions Commissions, Chairman of the Republic of Armenia State Tax Inspection Complaints Committee, Chairman of the State Examination Commission at the Armenian State University of Economics, and other

References

External links
 Edward Sandoyan: We are losing our state
 Edward Sandoyan: Armenia's economy not yet put on market rails
 Edward Sandoyan: Effective decisions impossible in an inefficient state
 Panel: Do Business Schools Teach What Their Customers Need? Edward Sandoyan

Living people
1961 births
Academic staff of Russian-Armenian University
Finance ministers of Armenia
Government ministers of Armenia